The Toronto Rock are a lacrosse team based in Toronto playing in the National Lacrosse League (NLL). The 2009 season was the 13th in franchise history, and 12th as the Rock.

On November 6, 2008, the Rock announced that veteran Chris Driscoll would be the new team captain, replacing the retired Jim Veltman.

Only three games into the season, the Rock fired head coach Glenn Clark and assistant coach Terry Bullen and hired former Chicago Shamrox and Colorado Mammoth coach Jamie Batley as the new head coach. Assistant coach Jim Veltman was relieved of his coaching duties, but remained with the Rock as an advisor.

After winning their first game of the season, the Rock won only once in their next eight games before a three-game winning streak gave fans some hope that the season was not lost. However, three straight losses forced the Rock out of the playoffs for the second straight year. Rock President Brad Watters said that the team "drastically under-delivered", and vowed to make whatever changes were necessary to fix the team.

Regular season

Conference standings

Game log
Reference:

Player stats
Reference:

Runners (Top 10)

Note: GP = Games played; G = Goals; A = Assists; Pts = Points; LB = Loose balls; PIM = Penalty minutes

Goaltenders
Note: GP = Games played; MIN = Minutes; W = Wins; L = Losses; GA = Goals against; Sv% = Save percentage; GAA = Goals against average

Transactions

New players
 Craig Conn - acquired in dispersal draft
 Jason Crosbie - signed as free agent
 Stephen Hoar - acquired in trade
 Luke Wiles - acquired in trade

Players not returning
 Mike Poulin - taken in expansion draft
 Jamie Taylor - released
 Matt Taylor - released
 Jim Veltman - retired

Trades

Entry draft
The 2008 NLL Entry Draft took place on September 7, 2008. The Rock selected the following players:

Roster

See also
2009 NLL season

References

Toronto
2009 in Toronto
2009 in Canadian sports